Dudinskaya may refer to: 
 asteroid 8470 Dudinskaya
 Natalia Dudinskaya, Russian prima ballerina